Final Cut: Ladies and Gentlemen  is a 2012 Hungarian experimental romantic film. It is directed by György Pálfi. The film is a mashup realized with 451 clips from the most famous films in history.
The "montage film"  was selected as the closing film for the 2012 Cannes Classics section.

Synopsis
The film tells about a love story between a man and a woman, told using scenes edited together from hundreds of other films from various genres. The film includes presences from numerous international actors and actresses via archive footages including:

 Isabelle Adjani
 Woody Allen 
 Agustín Almodóvar
 Fanny Ardant 
 Rosanna Arquette 
 Javier Bardem 
 Brigitte Bardot 
 Kim Basinger
 Jean-Paul Belmondo
 Marlon Brando
 Jeff Bridges
 Nicolas Cage
 Claudia Cardinale
 Àlex Casanovas
 Jackie Chan
 Charles Chaplin
 Geena Davis
 Johnny Depp
 Alain Delon
 Leonardo Di Caprio
 Henry Fonda
 Morgan Freeman
 Greta Garbo
 Mel Gibson
 Gina Lollobrigida
 Sophia Loren
 Marcello Mastroianni
 Bill Murray
 Václav Neckář
 Dennis Quaid
 Jason Robards
 Meryl Streep
 Patrick Swayze
 Magda Vašáryová
 Christopher Walken

Release
Final Cut: Ladies and Gentlemen was screened in numerous film festivals in 2012. It was officially released in 2016 on YouTube and in 2017 on Vimeo.

References

External links
 
Final Cut on YouTube
Final Cut on Vimeo

2012 romantic comedy-drama films
2010s sex comedy films
Hungarian romantic comedy-drama films
Collage film